Haliclystidae is a family of stalked jellyfish in the order Stauromedusae.

Gallery

Genera and species
According to the World Register of Marine Species, the following genera and species are found in this family:
Depastromorpha Carlgren, 1935
Depastromorpha africana Carlgren, 1935
Depastrum Gosse, 1858
Depastrum cyathiforme (M. Sars, 1846)
Haliclystus James-Clark, 1863
Haliclystus antarcticus Pfeffer, 1889
Haliclystus auricula James-Clark, 1863
Haliclystus borealis Uchida, 1933
Haliclystus californiensis Kahn, Matsumoto, Hirano & Collins, 2010
Haliclystus inabai (Kishinouye, 1893)
Haliclystus kerguelensis Vanhöffen, 1908
Haliclystus monstrosus (Naumov, 1961)
Haliclystus octoradiatus James-Clark, 1863
Haliclystus salpinx James-Clark, 1863
Haliclystus "sanjuanensis" nomen nudum
Haliclystus sinensis Ling, 1937
Haliclystus stejnegeri Kishinouye, 1899
Haliclystus tenuis Kishinouye, 1910
Halimocyathus James-Clark, 1863
Halimocyathus platypus James-Clark, 1863
Manania James-Clark, 1863
Manania atlantica (Berrill, 1962)
Manania auricula (Fabricius, 1780)
Manania distincta (Kishinouye, 1910)
Manania gwilliami Larson & Fautin, 1989
Manania handi Larson & Fautin, 1989
Manania hexaradiata (Broch, 1907)
Manania uchidai (Naumov, 1961)

References

 
Myostaurida
Cnidarian families